Lars Eckert (born 24 November 1983) is a German international rugby union player, playing for the SC Neuenheim in the Rugby-Bundesliga and the German national rugby union team.

He plays rugby since 1990. He played for RK 03 Berlin until 2004, when he joined SC Neuenheim.

He played his last game for Germany on 2 May 2009 against Russia.

In 2008-09, 2009–10 and 2010–11, he was his club's top point scorer.

Honours

National team
 European Nations Cup - Division 2
 Champions: 2008

Stats
Lars Eckert's personal statistics in club and international rugby:

Club

 As of 30 April 2012

National team

European Nations Cup

Friendlies & other competitions

 As of 28 April 2013

References

External links
 Lars Eckert at scrum.com
   Lars Eckert at totalrugby.de

1983 births
Living people
German rugby union players
Germany international rugby union players
RK 03 Berlin players
SC Neuenheim players
Rugby union fly-halves